The Chairman Planning and Development Board (Sindh) is the Chairman of the Planning and Development Department, and serves as the Chief Executive of the Board. Chairman P&D is considered to be the top most office in the Government of Sindh after those of Chief Minister and Chief Secretary of Sindh. The office of the Chairman has been vacant since May 2021 to date.

The Chairman oversees all policy matters of the Board and matters pertaining to development in Sindh. The Chairman is also responsible for coordinating with organizations such as World Bank, Asian Development Bank, and USAID. The Chairman P&D can even approach these foreign organizations through the Economic Affairs Division (Government of Pakistan). Apart from that, the Chairman is to maintain a close liaison with National planning or development agencies. The Chairman is the competent authority to process and approve all development schemes, proposals, and proposals submitted by other Departments of the Government of Sindh.

The Planning and Development Department has different wings such as the Monitoring and Evaluation Cell, Bureau of Statistics, and Research and Training Wing. The department also has 100+ specialized projects around Sindh, making it one of the largest Provincial Departments, not only in Sindh but around the country.

Sections of Planning & Development Department

List of Additional Chief Secretaries 
List of all those who served as the Additional Chief Secretaries (now abolished) of the P&D Department.

List of Chairpersons 
List of all those who served as Chairperson P&D Board.

History 
Previously the post of Chairman Planning and Development Board was referred to as Additional Chief Secretary Planning and Development. However, as the department and it's Board got larger, the post was abolished and replaced with Chairman P&D.

See also 

 Government of Sindh
 Chief Secretary of Sindh
 Grade-22

References 

Government of Sindh
Sindh